West Potato House was a historic potato house located near Delmar, Sussex County, Delaware. It was one of the last surviving examples of its building type.  It was built about 1925, and is a -story, gable fronted, balloon frame structure on a concrete block foundation. The house had a cellar. It measured 37 feet, 6 inches, by 13 feet, 9 inches.  It retained a number of important elements characteristic of potato house including: tall, narrow proportions, minimal fenestration, ventilation features, and tightly fitting door hatches.

It was placed on the National Register of Historic Places in 1990. It is listed on the Delaware Cultural and Historic Resources GIS system as destroyed or demolished.

References

Agricultural buildings and structures on the National Register of Historic Places in Delaware
Buildings and structures completed in 1925
Buildings and structures in Sussex County, Delaware
Potato houses in Delaware
National Register of Historic Places in Sussex County, Delaware
1920s establishments in Delaware